Francisco Castillo Fajardo, 2nd Marquis of Villadarias (es: Francisco Castillo Fajardo, segundo marqués de Villadarias) (Málaga, 17 December 1642 – 1716), was a Spanish general.

Service record 
Fajardo was the only son of Maria Muñoz y Ruiz and Antonio Arias Castillo Fajardo Maldonado, who was given the title of Marquis of Villadarias as a posthumous award for his other son, who was killed in Flanders in 1690. As it was Fajardo who was the first person to officially use the title when he inherited the honour in 1699.

In 1693 he defended Charleroi unsuccessfully against the French, becoming Capitán General de Guipúzcoa in 1696. In 1698 he defended Oran successfully against the Ottomans. In the same year he became the governor of the small Spanish territory of Ceuta on the north African coast. In 1702 he had to travel across the Straits of Gibraltar to become the captain-general of the southern tip of Iberia known as Andalucia.

In 1702, during the War of the Spanish Succession, he defended Cadiz successfully against a British-Dutch fleet under the command of George Rooke in what was called the Battle of Cadiz. From June to July 1704 he invaded Portugal and conquered Castelo de Vide and Marvão.

During 1704–1705 he tried to recapture Gibraltar from the British-Dutch in the Twelfth Siege of Gibraltar, until he was replaced on 8 February 1705 by the French Marshal de Tessé, who gave up the siege and retired.

In 1710 he was commander of the Bourbon army in Catalonia, where he lost the Battle of Almenar. After this battle he was replaced by the Marquis de Bay. In 1713 he became captain-general of Valencia.

He died in 1716 in Madrid.

References

Villadarias, Francisco Castillo Fajardo, Marquis of
Castillo Fajardo, Francisco
Villadarias, Francisco Castillo Fajardo, Marquis of
1642 births
1716 deaths